In computing, on the X Window System, X11 color names are represented in a simple text file, which maps certain strings to RGB color values. It was traditionally shipped with every X11 installation, hence the name, and is usually located in <X11root>/lib/X11/rgb.txt. The web colors list is descended from it but differs for certain color names.

Color names are not standardized by Xlib or the X11 protocol. The list does not show continuity either in selected color values or in color names, and some color triplets have multiple names. Despite this, graphic designers and others got used to them, making it practically impossible to introduce a different list. In earlier releases of X11 (prior to the introduction of Xcms), server implementors were encouraged to modify the RGB values in the reference color database to account for gamma correction.

As of X.Org Release 7.4 rgb.txt is no longer included in the roll up release, and the list is built directly into the server. The optional module xorg/app/rgb contains the stand-alone rgb.txt file.

The list first shipped with X10 release 3 (X10R3) on 7 June 1986, having been checked into RCS by Jim Gettys in 1985. The same list was in X11R1 on 18 September 1987. Approximately the full list as is available today shipped with X11R4 on 29 January 1989, with substantial additions by Paul Ravelling (who added colors based on Sinclair Paints samples), John C. Thomas (who added colors based on a set of 72 Crayola crayons he had on hand) and Jim Fulton (who reconciled contributions to produce the X11R4 list). The project was running DEC VT240 terminals at the time, so would have worked to that device.

In some applications multipart names are written with spaces, in others joined together, often in camel case. They are usually matched insensitive of case and the X Server source code contains spaced aliases for most entries; this article uses spaces and uppercase initials except where variants with spaces are not specified in the actual code.

Clashes between web and X11 colors in the CSS color scheme 

The first versions of Mosaic and Netscape Navigator used the X11 colors as the basis for the web colors list, as both were originally X applications. The W3C specifications SVG and CSS level 3 module Color eventually adopted the X11 list with some changes. The present W3C list is a superset of the 16 "VGA colors" defined in HTML 3.2 and CSS level 1.

One notable difference between X11 and W3C is the case of "Gray" and its variants. In HTML, "Gray" is specifically reserved for the 128 triplet (50% gray) . However, in X11, "gray" was assigned to the 190 triplet (74.5%) , which is close to W3C "Silver" at 192 (75.3%) , and had "Light Gray" at 211 (83%)  and "Dark Gray" at 169 (66%)  counterparts. As a result, the combined CSS 3.0 color list that prevails on the web today produces "Dark Gray"  as a significantly lighter tone than plain "Gray" , because "Dark Gray" was descended from X11 – for it did not exist in HTML nor CSS level 1 – while "Gray" was descended from HTML. Even in the current draft for CSS 4.0, dark gray continues to be a lighter shade than gray. Some browsers such as Netscape Navigator insisted on an "a" in any "Gray" except for "Light Grey".

Recent X releases also support the W3C definitions. In X11, the original definitions have been preserved (so "Dark Gray" remains a darker shade of "Gray"), but for every conflicting name pair, "Web" and additional "X11" prefixes have been added to ease disambiguation after the merger. The "X11" prefix is an alias for the non-prefixed version, i.e. "X11 Gray" = "Gray" ≠ "Web Gray". The W3C also defined a color that is equal to X11's "Green", but called it "Lime". In X11, this is simply called "Lime", as no such name existed before. It aliases to "Green", i.e. "Lime" = "Green" = "X11 Green" ≠ "Web Green".

Color name chart 
The following chart presents the standardized X11 color names from the X.org source code. The list of names accepted by browsers following W3C standards slightly differs as explained above. The table does not show numbered gray and brightness variants as described below. Actual rgb.txt files and other color databases or palettes may differ since they are freely editable by vendors and users. The table shows component values in several notations of the RGB color space, i.e. RGB, HSL and HSV, conversions are done assuming sRGB color space.

* Prior to standardization as a web color, Gainsboro was included as one of the X11 color names. It was, however, absent from the original 1987 version of the list, but present in Paul Raveling's version which added, amongst other things, "[l]ight and off-white colors, copied from several Sinclair Paints color samples".

Color variations

Shades of gray 
The complete rgb.txt defines 101 shades from 'Gray0' (black) up to 'Gray100' (white) in addition to 'Gray' and its variants listed above. The shades are apparently defined by the formula GrayN := round(N% × 255) resulting in e.g. 'Gray96' , which happens to be the same as 'White Smoke'. Similarly 'Dim Gray' is the same as 'Gray41' .

On the other hand, 'Gray'  lies between 'Gray74'  and 'Gray75' ; 'Dark Gray'  is not the same as 'Gray66' ; and 'Light Gray'  is not the same as 'Gray83' .

These shades are not included in W3C specifications, although drafts for level 4 of the CSS Color module include a similar function gray().
They are still coded without 'Grey' alternatives, but with no space before the digit.

Numbered variants 
For 78 colors (not counting grays), rgb.txt offers four variants "color1", "color2", "color3", and "color4", with "color1" sometimes corresponding to "color", so e.g. "Snow1" is the same as "Snow". Unlike base colors, e.g. cadet blue and CadetBlue, these are only coded without spaces, e.g. CadetBlue3. These variations are neither supported by popular browsers nor adopted by W3C standards. Whether or not a certain color has such variants seems random.

If "color1" is not the same as "color, the base color is usually darker. That means its brightness in HSB color notation is less than 100%; about 30 of the base colors are fully bright. The four variants (1...4) have rounded brightness values of 100%, 93%, 80% and 55%, respectively. Their hue and saturation are usually the same except for rounding. In some cases they differ from the base color, though, which may indicate that these variants were specified  with alternate definitions of the bases in mind, i.e. their values were adapted to a certain monitor which was commonly done by vendors until the 1990s.

The fixed brightness settings correspond closely to these formulae to determine the RGB values:
color1 := color × 100%
color2 := color1 × 93.2%
color3 := color1 × 80.4%
color4 := color1 × 54.8%

Examples:
  "Yellow 2" (238, 238, 0) is based on  "Yellow" (255, 255, 0) with 255 × 0.932 = 237.66.
  "Ivory 3" (205, 205, 193) is explained by  "Ivory" (255, 255, 240) where 255 × 0.804 = 205.02 and 240 × 0.804 = 192.96.
  "Azure 4" (131, 139, 139) is close to  "Azure" (240, 255, 255) values transformed as 255 × 0.548 = 139.74 and 240 × 0.548 = 131.52.

Prefixed variants 
Some color names appear to be brightness or saturation modifications of others because they bear prefixes such as Dark, Light, Medium, Pale or Deep, but there is no systematic variation apparent. Several sets, however, feature a Dark variant with 55% brightness and some have their Medium at about 80%.

"Light Goldenrod Yellow" and "Dark Olive Green" are special, because there are no corresponding color entries without Dark and Light prefixes.

Nuances with different hue 
Several groups of colors share the same lightness or brightness and saturation. These nuances differ only by hue.

 100%/25% 0°  (Web) Maroon, 60°  Olive, 120°  Green, 180°  Teal, 240°  Navy (Blue), 300°  (Web) Purple
 100%/27% 0°  Dark Red, 180°  Dark Cyan, 240°  Dark Blue, 300°  Dark Magenta
 100%/41% 181°  Dark Turquoise, 282°  Dark Violet
 100%/49% 90°  Lawn Green, 157°  Medium Spring Green
 61%/50% 80°  Yellow Green, 120°  Lime Green, 280°  Dark Orchid
 100%/50% 0°  Red, 16°  Orange Red, 33°  Dark Orange, 39°  Orange, 51°  Gold, 60°  Yellow, 90°  Chartreuse, 120°  (Lime) Green, 150°  Spring Green, 180°  Aqua / Cyan, 195°  Deep Sky Blue, 240°  Blue, 300°  Fuchsia / Magenta
 25%/65% 0°  Rosy Brown, 120°  Dark Sea Green
 59–60%/65% 260°  Medium Purple, 302°  Orchid, 340°  Pale Violet Red
 100%/86% 38°  Moccasin, 351°  Light Pink
 100%/90% 36°  Blanched Almond, 54°  Lemon Chiffon
 67%/94% 30°  Linen, 240°  Lavender
 100%/94% 6°  Misty Rose, 60°  Light Yellow, 180°  Light Cyan
 100%/97% 25°  Seashell, 40°  Floral White, 60°  Ivory, 120°  Honeydew, 180°  Azure, 208°  Alice Blue, 340°  Lavender Blush
 100%/99% 0°  Snow, 240°  Ghost White

Tints and shades with different lightness 
Several groups of colors share the same hue and HSL saturation. Tints are lighter than a base color, shades are darker.

 0°/0% 0%  Black, 41%  Dim Gray, 50%  (Web) Gray, 66%  Dark Gray, 75%  (X11) Gray, 75%  Silver, 83%  Light Gray, 86%  Gainsboro, 96%  White Smoke, 100%  White
 0°/100% 25%  (Web) Maroon, 27%  Dark Red, 50%  Red, 99%  Snow
 16°/100% 50%  Orange Red, 66%  Coral
 33°/100% 50%  Dark Orange, 88%  Bisque
 36°/100% 84%  Navajo White, 90%  Blanched Almond
 60°/100% 25%  Olive, 50%  Yellow, 94%  Light Yellow, 97%  Ivory
 80°/61% 35%  Olive Drab, 50%  Yellow Green
 90°/100% 49%  Lawn Green, 50%  Chartreuse
 120°/61% 34%  Forest Green, 50%  Lime Green
 120°/100% 20%  Dark Green, 25%  (Web) Green, 50%  (X11) Green / Lime, 97%  Honeydew
 146–147°/50% 36%  Sea Green, 47%  Medium Sea Green
 150°/100% 50%  Spring Green, 98%  Mint Cream
 180–181°/100% 25%  Teal, 27%  Dark Cyan, 41%  Dark Turquoise, 50%  Aqua / Cyan, 94%  Light Cyan, 97%  Azure
 240°/100% 25%  Navy Blue, 27%  Dark Blue, 40%  Medium Blue, 50%  Blue, 99%  Ghost White
 300°/100% 25%  (Web) Purple, 27%  Dark Magenta, 50%  Fuchsia / Magenta
 328–330°/100% 54%  Deep Pink, 71%  Hot Pink
 350–351°/100% 88%  Pink, 86%  Light Pink

Tones with different saturation 
Some pairs of colors share the same lightness and hue. These tones differ only by saturation. Tones are far less common in the X11 set than nuances, tints and shades.

 0°/41% 0%  Dim Gray, 59%  Brown
 120°/50% 61%  Lime Green, 100%  Green / Lime
 180°/25% 25%  Dark Slate Gray, 100%  Teal
 240°/27% 64%  Midnight Blue, 100%  Dark Blue

Derived lists 

The Printer Working Group (PWG) of the IEEE publishes a standard, PWG 5101.1, whose mandatory color names are based upon RFC 3805, successor to RFC 1759 which imported the functional color names other, unknown and transparent alongside seven basic colors from ISO 10175 (DPA) and ISO 10180 (SPDL), and JTAPI. This standard has four variants for each non-monochromatic color: clear (50% transparent), dark, light and the default. Missing variant values have been added systematically. Buff and Mustard are completely new color names. Light Black and Gray correspond to the same color.

|}

See also 
 List of colors
 XPM (image format)
 Web colors § X11 color names

References

External links 
 X-Server source code with built-in colors
 "Extended Color Keywords", CSS Color Module Level 3, a W3C Recommendation
 X11 rgb.txt 1.1 at Xfree.86.org, 1994, and  X11 rgb.txt 1.2, 2005 (excluding 96 aliases).
 Aubrey Jaffer. "Color-Name Dictionaries". Jaffer's page includes extensive information about and comparisons between color-name dictionaries.

Color names
X Window System
Cascading Style Sheets